The Girl is a 2014 Chinese romantic comedy film directed by Guan Xiaojie, Niu Dong, and Ma Donghua, starring Zhao Yihuan, Leon Jay Williams, Jo Jiang, and Wen Mengyang. The film was released in China on 24 November 2014.

Cast
 Zhao Yihuan as Ai Meili
 Leon Jay Williams as Lin Yixuan
 Jiang Chao as Yu Haoran
 Wen Mengyang as Anni Miduo

Music
 Zhao Yihuan - "Shayang" (Chinese:傻样)

References

External links
 
 

2014 romantic comedy films
Chinese romantic comedy films
Films directed by Guan Xiaojie
2010s Mandarin-language films